The 2014–15 Washington State Cougars women's basketball team represented Washington State University during the 2014–15 NCAA Division I women's basketball season. The cougars, led by eighth year head coach June Daugherty, played their games at the Beasley Coliseum and were members of the Pac-12 Conference. They finished the season 17–15, 7–11 in the Pac-12 to finish in a tie for seventh place. They advanced to the quarterfinals of the Pac-12 women's tournament where they lost to Arizona State. They were invited to the Women's National Invitation Tournament which they lost in the first round against their in-state rival Eastern Washington.

Roster

Schedule

|-
!colspan=9 style="background:#981E32; color:#FFFFFF;"| Exhibition

|-
!colspan=9 style="background:#981E32; color:#FFFFFF;"| Non-conference regular season

|-
!colspan=9 style="background:#981E32; color:#FFFFFF;"| Pac-12 regular season

|-
!colspan=9 style="background:#981E32;"| Pac-12 Women's Tournament

|-
!colspan=9 style="background:#981E32;"| WNIT

Rankings

See also
 2014–15 Washington State Cougars men's basketball team

References

Washington State Cougars women's basketball seasons
2014 in sports in Washington (state)
2015 in sports in Washington (state)